Ommatius is a genus of robber flies. It is part of the subfamily Asilinae, containing the following species:

Ommatius abana Curran, 1953
Ommatius abdelkuriensis Scarbrough, 2002
Ommatius achaetus Scarbrough, 1994
Ommatius acornutus Scarbrough, Marasci & Hill, 2003
Ommatius acutus Scarbrough, 1990
Ommatius aegyptius Efflatoun, 1934
Ommatius aequalis (Becker, 1925)
Ommatius albovittatus Wiedemann, 1824
Ommatius alexanderi Farr, 1965
Ommatius alienus (Osten Sacken, 1882)
Ommatius allopoecius Oldroyd, 1972
Ommatius ampliatus Scarbrough, 2002
Ommatius amula Curran, 1928
Ommatius amurensis (Richter, 1960)
Ommatius angulosus Scarbrough, 2002
Ommatius angustatus Scarbrough, 2002
Ommatius angustus Scarbrough, 2003
Ommatius annulatus Bigot, 1887
Ommatius annulitarsis Curran, 1927
Ommatius apicalis (Bellardi, 1861)
Ommatius argentatus Meijere, 1911
Ommatius argyrochirus Wulp, 1872
Ommatius aridus Scarbrough, 2002
Ommatius aruensis Wulp, 1872
Ommatius arunachalensis Joseph & Parui, 1983
Ommatius ater Bromley, 1935
Ommatius atrogaster Bigot, 1859
Ommatius atrosus Scarbrough, 1997
Ommatius auribarbis Wiedemann, 1828
Ommatius ayalai Scarbrough, 2002
Ommatius baboquivari Wilcox, 1936
Ommatius bacchoides Walker, 1864
Ommatius barbiellinii Curran, 1934
Ommatius bastardoanus Scarbrough 2003
Ommatius beameri Wilcox, 1936
Ommatius bengalensis Joseph & Parui, 1987
Ommatius bevisi Bromley, 1947
Ommatius bicolor (Bigot, 1875)
Ommatius bicolor Martin, 1964 (Homonym)
Ommatius bifidus Martin, 1964
Ommatius biharensis Joseph & Parui, 1987
Ommatius bipartitus Scarbrough, 1985
Ommatius biseriatus (Becker, 1925)
Ommatius bromleyi Pritchard, 1935
Ommatius bullatus Scarbrough, 2002
Ommatius callidus Scarbrough, 2003
Ommatius canicoxa Speiser, 1913
Ommatius canus Walker, 1865
Ommatius carbonarius Scarbrough, Marasci & Hill, 2003
Ommatius carmichaeli Bromley, 1935
Ommatius cassidea (Scarbrough & Marascia, 1999)
Ommatius catus Scarbrough & Costantino, 2005
Ommatius chiastoneurus Speiser, 1910
Ommatius chrysopilus Oldroyd, 1972
Ommatius cinnamomeus Scarbrough, 1984
Ommatius cinthiae Vieira, Castro & Bravo, 2004
Ommatius clava (Scarbrough & Marascia, 1999)
Ommatius cnemideus Bigot, 1877
Ommatius coeraebus Walker, 1849
Ommatius compactus (Becker, 1925)
Ommatius complanatus Scarbrough, 1994
Ommatius concavus Martin, 1964
Ommatius conciens Wulp, 1872
Ommatius confusus Martin, 1964
Ommatius conopsoides Wiedemann, 1828
Ommatius constrictus Scarbrough, 2002
Ommatius conus Scarbrough, 2002
Ommatius cornutus Scarbrough, Marasci & Hill, 2003
Ommatius costatus Rondani, 1850
Ommatius crypticus Oldroyd, 1972
Ommatius cubanus Scarbrough, 1985
Ommatius curtus Scarbrough, Marasci & Hill, 2003
Ommatius curvimargo (Bezzi, 1928)
Ommatius curvipes Meijere, 1915
Ommatius densus Martin, 1964
Ommatius dentatus Scarbrough, 1994
Ommatius depressus Scarbrough, 2002
Ommatius despectus Wulp, 1872
Ommatius destitutus Scarbrough, 2002
Ommatius didymus Scarbrough, 1994
Ommatius digitus Scarbrough, Marasci & Hill, 2003
Ommatius dignus Scarbrough, 2000
Ommatius dilatipennis Wulp, 1872
Ommatius dimidiatus Macquart, 1850
Ommatius dimidiatus Scarbrough, 1985 (Homonym)
Ommatius discalis Walker, 1861
Ommatius discus Martin, 1964
Ommatius dispar Macquart, 1848
Ommatius disparis Scarbrough, 2007
Ommatius distinctus Ricardo, 1918
Ommatius docimus Oldroyd, 1972
Ommatius dolabriformis Scarbrough, 2002
Ommatius dolon Oldroyd, 1972
Ommatius dravidicus Joseph & Parui, 1983
Ommatius dubius Joseph & Parui, 1987
Ommatius elusivus Scarbrough, 2003
Ommatius emarginatus Scarbrough, 1985
Ommatius epipomus Oldroyd, 1972
Ommatius episkeris Oldroyd, 1972
Ommatius erythropus Schiner, 1867
Ommatius erythropygus Curran, 1927
Ommatius euplocus Oldroyd, 1972
Ommatius excurrens Wulp, 1872
Ommatius exilis Curran, 1928
Ommatius falcatus Scarbrough, 1984
Ommatius fallax Bigot, 1859
Ommatius fanovana Bromley, 1942
Ommatius femoratus Bigot, 1875
Ommatius fernandezi Scarbrough, 2002
Ommatius fimbriatus Hardy, 1949
Ommatius fimbrillus Scarbrough, 2000
Ommatius flavescens Scarbrough, 2003
Ommatius flavicaudus Malloch, 1929
Ommatius flavipennis Scarbrough, 2003
Ommatius flavipes Macquart, 1834
Ommatius flavipes Loew, 1858 (Homonym)
Ommatius flavipyga (Becker, 1925)
Ommatius flexus Scarbrough, 2002
Ommatius floridensis Bullington & Lavigne, 1984
Ommatius forticulus Scarbrough & Costantino, 2005
Ommatius frauenfeldi Schiner, 1868
Ommatius fulvimanus Wulp, 1872
Ommatius furcinus Martin, 1964
Ommatius fusciformis Becker, 1926
Ommatius fuscipennis Bellardi, 1861
Ommatius fuscus Joseph & Parui, 1985
Ommatius fusiformis (Becker, 1926)
Ommatius galba (Scarbrough & Marascia, 1999)
Ommatius garambensis Oldroyd, 1970
Ommatius geminus Martin, 1964
Ommatius geminus Scarbrough & Perez-Gelabert, 2006 (Homonym)
Ommatius gemma Brimley, 1928
Ommatius genitalis Joseph & Parui, 1987
Ommatius gladiatus Scarbrough, 2002
Ommatius gopalpurensis Joseph & Parui, 1987
Ommatius gracilis Walker, 1857
Ommatius griseipennis (Becker, 1925)
Ommatius gwenae Scarbrough, 1984
Ommatius haemorrhoidalis Lindner, 1955
Ommatius hageni (Meijere, 1911)
Ommatius haitiensis Scarbrough, 1984
Ommatius hanebrinki Scarbrough & Rutkauskas, 1983
Ommatius harlequin Oldroyd, 1974
Ommatius hecale Walker, 1849
Ommatius hierroi Scarbrough, 2003
Ommatius hispaniolae Scarbrough, 1984
Ommatius hispidus Scarbrough, 1985
Ommatius holosericeus Schiner, 1867
Ommatius hradskyi Joseph & Parui, 1983
Ommatius hulli Joseph & Parui, 1983
Ommatius humatus Scarbrough, 1994
Ommatius hyacinthinus (Bigot, 1877)
Ommatius hyalinipennis Wulp, 1898
Ommatius impeditus Wulp, 1872
Ommatius imperator Oldroyd, 1939
Ommatius incurvatus Scarbrough, 1994
Ommatius indicus Joseph & Parui, 1983
Ommatius infirmus Wulp, 1872
Ommatius inflatus Scarbrough, 2003
Ommatius infractus Scarbrough, 1985
Ommatius infuscatus Scarbrough, 1990
Ommatius insectatus Scarbrough & Costantino, 2005
Ommatius insularis Wulp, 1872
Ommatius integerrimus Scarbrough, 1990
Ommatius invehens Walker, 1864
Ommatius jabalpurensis Joseph & Parui, 1983
Ommatius jamaicensis Farr, 1965
Ommatius jonesi Joseph & Parui, 1985
Ommatius kambangensis Meijere, 1914
Ommatius kempi Joseph & Parui, 1983
Ommatius kodaikanalensis Joseph & Parui, 1995
Ommatius lambertoni Bromley, 1942
Ommatius laticrus Scarbrough & Perez-Gelabert, 2006
Ommatius lema Walker, 1849
Ommatius leucopogon Wiedemann, 1824
Ommatius lineatus Martin, 1964
Ommatius lineolatus Scarbrough, 1988
Ommatius litoreus Scarbrough & Marascia, 2003
Ommatius lividipes Bigot, 1891
Ommatius longiforceps Bromley, 1942
Ommatius longinquus Martin, 1964
Ommatius longipennis Lindner, 1955
Ommatius lucidatus Scarbrough, 1997
Ommatius lucifer Walker, 1858
Ommatius lunatus Scarbrough, 2002
Ommatius lurismus Oldroyd, 1968
Ommatius mackayi Ricardo, 1913
Ommatius macquarti Bezzi, 1908
Ommatius macroscelis Bezzi, 1906
Ommatius maculatus Banks, 1911
Ommatius maculosus Scarbrough & Perez-Gelabert, 2006
Ommatius madagascariensis Macquart, 1838
Ommatius major (Becker, 1925)
Ommatius malabaricus Joseph & Parui, 1985
Ommatius manipulus Oldroyd, 1972
Ommatius marginellus (Fabricius, 1781)
Ommatius marginosus Scarbrough, Marasci & Hill, 2003
Ommatius mariae Scarbrough, 2000
Ommatius medius (Becker, 1925)
Ommatius megacephalus (Bellardi, 1861)
Ommatius membranosus Scarbrough, 1985
Ommatius minimus Doleschall, 1857
Ommatius minor Doleschall, 1857
Ommatius minusculus Scarbrough & Hill, 2000
Ommatius minutus Bromley, 1936
Ommatius mitrai Joseph & Parui, 1993
Ommatius monensis Scarbrough, 1984
Ommatius munroi Bromley, 1936
Ommatius nanus Walker, 1851
Ommatius narrius Scarbrough, 2002
Ommatius nealus Oldroyd, 1960
Ommatius nebulosus Scarbrough, 2008
Ommatius neofimbriatus Martin, 1964
Ommatius neotenellus Bromley, 1936
Ommatius neotropicus Curran, 1928
Ommatius nigellus Scarbrough, 1984
Ommatius niger (Schiner, 1868)
Ommatius nigrantis Scarbrough, 2003
Ommatius nigrifemorata Bigot, 1876
Ommatius nigripes Meijere, 1913
Ommatius norma Curran, 1928
Ommatius obscurus White, 1918
Ommatius oklahomensis Bullington & Lavigne, 1984
Ommatius orenoquensis Bigot, 1876
Ommatius oreophilus Farr, 1965
Ommatius ornatipes (Becker, 1926)
Ommatius ornatus Scarbrough, Marasci & Hill, 2003
Ommatius orus Oldroyd, 1968
Ommatius otorus Oldroyd, 1960
Ommatius ouachitensis Bullington & Lavigne, 1984
Ommatius ovatus Scarbrough, 2002
Ommatius pallidapex Bigot, 1891
Ommatius pallidicoxa Curran, 1927
Ommatius parvulus Schaeffer, 1916
Ommatius parvus Bigot, 1875
Ommatius pashokensis Joseph & Parui, 1983
Ommatius pauper (Becker, 1925)
Ommatius perangustimus Scarbrough, 1990
Ommatius peregrinus Osten Sacken, 1887 (Homonym)
Ommatius peregrinus (Wulp, 1872)
Ommatius peristus Oldroyd, 1972
Ommatius pernecessarius Scarbrough, 2003
Ommatius perscientus Scarbrough, 2003
Ommatius persuasus Oldroyd, 1960
Ommatius pictipennis Bigot, 1875
Ommatius piliferous Scarbrough, 1985
Ommatius pillaii Joseph & Parui, 1986
Ommatius pilosulus (Bigot, 1875)
Ommatius pilosus White, 1916
Ommatius pinguis Wulp, 1872
Ommatius pisinnus Martin, 1964
Ommatius planatus Scarbrough & Marascia, 2000
Ommatius politus Scarbrough & Marascia, 2000
Ommatius ponti Joseph & Parui, 1985
Ommatius praelongus Scarbrough & Perez-Gelabert, 2006
Ommatius praestigiatus Scarbrough, 1990
Ommatius pretiosus Banks, 1911
Ommatius prolongatus Scarbrough, 1985
Ommatius pseudodravidicus Joseph & Parui, 1983
Ommatius pseudojabalpurensis Joseph & Parui, 1999
Ommatius pseudokempi Joseph & Parui, 1987
Ommatius pulchellus Bromley, 1936
Ommatius pulcher (Engel, 1885)
Ommatius pulverius Scarbrough, 1997
Ommatius pumilus Macquart, 1847
Ommatius puniceus Martin, 1964
Ommatius pygmaeus Wiedemann, 1824
Ommatius quadratus Scarbrough, 2002
Ommatius queenslandi Ricardo, 1913
Ommatius ramakrishnai Joseph & Parui, 1999
Ommatius recurvus Martin, 1964
Ommatius retrahens Walker, 1858
Ommatius riali Vieira, Castro & Bravo, 2005
Ommatius rubicundus Wulp, 1872
Ommatius ruficauda Curran, 1928
Ommatius rufipes Macquart, 1838
Ommatius rufipes Macquart, 1846 (Homonym)
Ommatius rugula (Scarbrough & Marascia, 1999)
Ommatius russelli Scarbrough, 1984
Ommatius saccas Walker, 1849
Ommatius satius Oldroyd, 1960
Ommatius scarbroughi Rodriguez Velazquez & Fernandez Vazquez, 1998
Ommatius schineri Martin, 1965
Ommatius schlegelii Wulp, 1884
Ommatius scopifer Schiner, 1868
Ommatius segouensis Scarbrough & Marascia, 2003
Ommatius senex Bromley, 1936
Ommatius serenus Wulp, 1872
Ommatius serrajiboiensis Vieira, Castro & Bravo, 2004
Ommatius seticrista Martin, 1964
Ommatius setiferous Scarbrough, 1988
Ommatius setiger Martin, 1964
Ommatius shishodiai Joseph & Parui, 1993
Ommatius signinipes Rondani, 1875
Ommatius similis (Becker, 1925)
Ommatius simulans Scarbrough, 2002
Ommatius singhi Joseph & Parui, 1993
Ommatius singlensis Oldroyd, 1975
Ommatius sinuatus Scarbrough, Marasci & Hill, 2003
Ommatius sparsus Scarbrough & Hill, 2000
Ommatius spathulatus (Doleschall, 1858)
Ommatius spatulatus Curran, 1928 (Homonym)
Ommatius speciosus Scarbrough & Hill, 2000
Ommatius spinalis (Scarbrough & Marascia, 1996)
Ommatius spinosus Scarbrough, 1994
Ommatius stackelbergi (Richter, 1960)
Ommatius stramineus Scarbrough, 1984
Ommatius striatus (Efflatoun, 1934)
Ommatius strictus Walker, 1859
Ommatius strigatipes Meijere, 1911
Ommatius strigicostus (Bezzi, 1928)
Ommatius subgracilis Bromley, 1935
Ommatius suffusus Wulp, 1872
Ommatius suntius Oldroyd, 1972
Ommatius taeniomerus Rondani, 1875
Ommatius tamenensis Joseph & Parui, 1983
Ommatius tandapiensis Scarbrough, 2002
Ommatius tandoni Joseph & Parui, 1983
Ommatius tarchetius Walker, 1849
Ommatius tecturus (Scarbrough & Marascia, 1999)
Ommatius tenellus Wulp, 1899
Ommatius tepui Scarbrough, 2008
Ommatius terminalis Bromley, 1936
Ommatius texanus Bullington & Lavigne, 1984
Ommatius tibialis Ricardo, 1903 (Homonym)
Ommatius tibialis Say, 1823
Ommatius tinctipennis Curran, 1927
Ommatius torulosus (Becker, 1925)
Ommatius tractus Scarbrough, 2007
Ommatius triangularis Scarbrough, 2002
Ommatius tridens Martin, 1964
Ommatius triniger Martin, 1964
Ommatius tropidus Scarbrough, 2002
Ommatius truncatus Joseph & Parui, 1984
Ommatius tuberculatus Joseph & Parui, 1983
Ommatius tucumanensis Scarbrough, 2002
Ommatius tumidus Martin, 1964
Ommatius tumulatus Oldroyd, 1960
Ommatius ula (Scarbrough & Marascia, 1999)
Ommatius uncatus Scarbrough, 1994
Ommatius unguiculatus Scarbrough, 2002
Ommatius unicolor (Becker, 1925)
Ommatius upertelus Oldroyd, 1960
Ommatius vankampeni Meijere, 1915
Ommatius variabilis (Engel, 1929)
Ommatius varipes Curran, 1927
Ommatius varitibiatus (Ricardo, 1929)
Ommatius venator Speiser, 1910
Ommatius villosus Scarbrough, 1985
Ommatius virgulatus Martin, 1964
Ommatius vitreus Bigot, 1875
Ommatius vittatus Curran, 1927
Ommatius vitticrus Bigot, 1876
Ommatius vivus Scarbrough, 1997
Ommatius wilcoxi Bullington & Lavigne, 1984
Ommatius willistoni Curran, 1928

References

Asilidae
Asilidae genera